Edson Rolando Silva Sousa (born 9 March 1983 in São Vicente, Cape Verde)
is a Portuguese football manager and former player. He is the head coach of Falcões do Norte in Cape Verde. He played as a forward.

Edson Silva signed for Tottenham from PSV Eindhoven shortly before the 2004/05 season got underway. Tottenham's Sporting Director Frank Arnesen had signed him for PSV after spotting him playing for Portugal's youth teams. The attacking midfielder signed a one-year deal with an option to extend that at the end of the season.

Unfortunately, he did not reach the first team but was named on the bench for a number of Premier League games.  He left Spurs in January 2005 to join Den Haag. After scoring 3 goals for Den Haag, Egyptian side Zamalek signed him.

In the beginning of 2007 he was signed by Romanian Liga I side UTA Arad. After the 2008 season and relegation with UTA, he then left Romania and trained with Finnish Veikkausliiga club TPS Turku. Afterwards, he returned to Romania and signed a contract with Ceahlăul Piatra Neamț.

References

External links

1983 births
Living people
Portuguese footballers
Portuguese people of Cape Verdean descent
Portuguese expatriate footballers
FC Luzern players
Portuguese expatriate sportspeople in Romania
Expatriate footballers in Romania
Expatriate footballers in Switzerland
Expatriate footballers in the Netherlands
Liga I players
Liga II players
FC Baden players
PSV Eindhoven players
ADO Den Haag players
FC Solothurn players
Zamalek SC players
FC UTA Arad players
CSM Ceahlăul Piatra Neamț players
People from São Vicente, Cape Verde
Tottenham Hotspur F.C. players
Association football midfielders
Egyptian Premier League players
Black Portuguese sportspeople